21 Persei is a single, variable star in the northern constellation of Perseus, located about 331 light years away from the Sun. It is visible to the naked eye as a faint, white-hued star with an apparent visual magnitude of 5.10 km/s. The object is moving further from the Earth with a heliocentric radial velocity of +8.5 km/s. It has the variable star designation LT Persei; 21 Persei is the Flamsteed designation.

This is an Ap star with a stellar classification of A2VspSiEu, where the A2V indicates it is an A-type main-sequence star, 's' means narrow "sharp" absorption, and SiEu shows abundance anomalies of the elements silicon and europium. The star is an Alpha2 Canum Venaticorum variable, meaning that the star has a strong magnetic field chromium, silicon, and strontium spectral lines. 21 Persei's period of variability is approximately 2.88 days.

References

B-type main-sequence stars
Alpha2 Canum Venaticorum variables
Ap stars
Perseus (constellation)
BD+31 509
Persei, 21
018296
013775
0873
Persei, LT